Business of Design Week (BODW) is an annual week-long design event organised every December by the Hong Kong Design Centre. BODW was launched in 2002. It includes a design conference, forums, seminars, exhibitions and award presentations.

BODW annually invites designers, business leaders and educators to speak and share their opinions in various forums. Past speakers include Marcel Wanders, Rem Koolhaas, Raman Hui, Rossana Hu, Richard Hutten, Zaha Hadid, Tom Dixon, Michael Young, Jimmy Choo, Sir John Sorrell, Karim Rashid, Ross Lovegrove, Marc Newson, and Vivienne Tam.

Each year, BODW forms a partnership with a different country. The country is invited to bring a group of designers to Hong Kong to give presentations at the conference. The country can also hold exhibitions and seminars about its national design. 

BODW has main events which occur each year including the BODW Forum where designers give presentations. There is also the HKDC Award Gala Dinner where the HKDC Awards are presented. These awards include the Design for Asia Awards, the World’s Outstanding Chinese Designer Award, the Design Leadership Award, the Design for Asia Award, and the Hong Kong Young Design Talent Awards.

Past BODW

References

External links
 Business of Design Week website
 Asian Design Comes of Age - BusinessWeek
 China chic, not China cheap - Guardian.co.uk - The Observer
 Adding business element to design China Daily
 Fresh Hot Design Features - DesignTaxi
 What's New - Outgoing - Spark Awards
 Design Awards Asia Design - Business Week
 Dutch Fashion Soiree - lifestyle Asia
 Business of Packers 2020

Arts in Hong Kong
Annual events in Hong Kong
Design events